Dongeng Kancil untuk Kemerdekaan (Kancil's Tale of Freedom) is a 1995 Indonesian documentary film directed by Garin Nugroho.

Synopsis
The film commemorates the 50th anniversary of Sukarno driving through the street in the aftermath and waving the Flag of Indonesia as he became the first President proclaiming "My nationalism is humanity".

The film investigates modern life on the street and whether early promises made by Sukarno lived up to expectations.

References

External links
 

1995 films
1990s Indonesian-language films
Yogyakarta
Documentary films about street children
Documentary films about politicians
Films directed by Garin Nugroho
Films shot in Indonesia
Indonesian documentary films
1995 documentary films